The Guangji Temple is a Buddhist temple located at inner Fuchengmen Street, Xicheng District, Beijing, China. It is also the headquarters of the Buddhist Association of China, founded by Master Xuyun, who is the father of modern Buddhism and hailed from Zhenru Temple. The current abbot is Shi Yanjue.

Originally built in the Jin dynasty (1115-1234), additions were made to the temple by successive dynasties. However, the present temple was completed during the Ming dynasty (1368–1644). The major structures in the temple divides between the main gate and four other large halls and many other temples.

The temple houses a wall of 18 Buddhist figures, many Ming dynasty religious relics and a library of over 100,000 volumes of scriptures in 20 different languages, some of which date back to the time of the Song dynasty (960–1279).

References

External links

Guangji Temple-Tour Beijing
Guangji Temple-China.org.cn

Major National Historical and Cultural Sites in Beijing
Buddhist temples in Beijing